, is a Japanese professional footballer who plays as forward for Giravanz Kitakyushu.

Club statistics
Updated to 23 February 2019.

References

External links

Profile at Yokohama FC

1994 births
Living people
Waseda University alumni
Association football people from Saitama Prefecture
Association football forwards
Japanese footballers
Yokohama FC players
Kagoshima United FC players
Azul Claro Numazu players
SC Sagamihara players
Giravanz Kitakyushu players
J2 League players
J3 League players